The Hamburger Konservatorium is a music conservatory located in the Sülldorf quarter of Hamburg, and it is one of the largest private music schools in Germany. Established as the Klaer'sches Konservatorium für Musik in 1908, it is the oldest school of music in Northern Germany. The school offers a variety of courses, including undergraduate, graduate, and post-graduate diplomas under the umbrella of the conservatory's Music Academy, and courses for children and non-degree seeking adults of all ages under the umbrella of the conservatory's Music School. Mark Menke is the school's current director.

Notable alumni

Harry Adaskin, violinist
Rainer Baumann, guitarist and composer  
Andreas Delfs, conductor
Yared Dibaba, actor, author, and singer
Henner Hoier, composer, singer, and guitarist
Franz Knies, tenor
G. Christian Lobback, organist and organ builder
Emanuel Melik-Aslanian, composer and pianist
Horst Mühlbradt, jazz musician and composer

Helga Pilarczyk, soprano
Herbert Rehbein, composer
Michael Renkel, guitarist
Susanne Rode-Breymann, musicologist
Peter Ruzicka, composer and conductor
Wolfgang-Andreas Schultz, composer
Florian Tessloff, composer and arranger
Claus Unzen, film, stage, and opera director

Notable faculty

Hugo Riemann, musicologist
Marie-Agnes Dittrich, musicologist
Simone Eckert, violist
Sorin Enachescu, pianist
Hans Haider, guitarist and composer

Hans-Georg Lotz, composer
Walter Niemann, composer
Claudia Schwarze, cellist
Klauspeter Seibel, conductor
Michael Stricharz, violinist

References

Educational institutions established in 1908
Music schools in Germany
Universities and colleges in Hamburg
Buildings and structures in Altona, Hamburg
1908 establishments in Germany